Heinz Stettler (March 1, 1952 in Regensdorf - May 24, 2006) was a Swiss bobsledder who competed during the early to mid-1980s. He won a bronze medal in the four-man event at the 1984 Winter Olympics in Sarajevo.

Stettler also won two medals in the four-man event at the FIBT World Championships with a gold in 1982 and a bronze in 1985.

He was also active in track and field, excelling in the shot put and discus throw. Stettler died of a heart attack in 2006.

References
 Bobsleigh four-man Olympic medalists for 1924, 1932-56, and since 1964
 Bobsleigh four-man world championship medalists since 1930
 German Wikipedia article on Stettler 

1952 births
2006 deaths
Bobsledders at the 1984 Winter Olympics
Swiss male shot putters
Swiss male discus throwers
Swiss male bobsledders
Olympic bobsledders of Switzerland
Olympic bronze medalists for Switzerland
Olympic medalists in bobsleigh
Medalists at the 1984 Winter Olympics
Regensdorf
20th-century Swiss people